Anchor Inn may refer to:
 The Anchor Inn (Birmingham), a public house in Digbeth, Birmingham, England
Anchor Inn (Dorset), a public house in Dorset, England
The Anchor Inn (Combwich),  a public house in Somerset, England
 The Anchor Inn (Wheaton, Maryland), a former restaurant and business development in Wheaton, Maryland